Virginia's 77th House of Delegates district elects one of 100 seats in the Virginia House of Delegates, the lower house of the state's bicameral legislature. District 77 is in Chesapeake and Suffolk. Cliff Hayes Jr. represents the district. For the 2019 election, Delegate Hayes ran against Ron Wallace, the Republican candidate from Chesapeake.

District officeholders

References

Virginia House of Delegates districts
Chesapeake, Virginia
Suffolk, Virginia